Irandegan Castle is a castle in Irandegan District, Khash County, Iran, and is one of the attractions of Khash County. This castle was built by the Qajar dynasty.

References 

Castles in Iran

Qajar castles